Barbapapa is a 1970 children's picture book by the French-American couple Annette Tison and Talus Taylor, who lived in Paris, France. Barbapapa is both the title character and the name of his "species". The book was the first of a series of children's books originally written in French and later translated into over 30 languages.

Barbe à papa – literally "Daddy's beard" – is French for cotton candy or candy floss.

Background
The inspiration for Barbapapa came by chance in the Luxembourg Garden in Paris one day in May 1970. While walking in the park with Annette Tison, Talus Taylor thought he heard a child ask his parents for something called "Baa baa baa baa". Not speaking French, he asked Tison what the words meant. She explained that the child was asking for a treat called Barbe à papa (cotton candy, literally 'daddy's beard'). Later at a restaurant, the couple began to draw on the tablecloth and came up with a character inspired by the candy: a pink and round character. When it came time to give it a name, Barbapapa came naturally.

Several European publishers expressed interest in Barbapapa but did not wish to spend the publishing cost. Frank Fehmers, a Dutch publisher, subsequently set up a co-production, and the first editions were published in 1970. The original editions were published in French by L'École des Loisirs, in Dutch by Frank Fehmers Productions, in British English by the Ernest Benn Company, and in American English by the Henry Z. Walck Co.

Characters
The main characters in the books are the Barbapapa family, who are most notable for their ability to shapeshift at will. In their native form, Barbapapas are blob-shaped, with a distinct head and arms, but no legs. Male Barbapapas have rounder bottoms, whereas female Barbapapas have a more slender form. Each Barbapapa can adopt any form they choose, but they remain easily identifiable by always retaining their faces and their distinctive colour.

Barbapapa himself is a generally papaya-shaped, pink shapeshifting blob-like creature who grows from the ground and tries to fit in the human world. The shapeshifting is usually accompanied by the saying "Clickety Click—Barba Trick", or in the 1970s British dub "All Change!"

After various adventures, Barbapapa comes across a female of his species (more shapely, and black-coloured), named Barbamama. They produce seven children: Four sons: Barbabravo, a sports fan (red), Barbabright, a scientist (blue), Barbazoo, a nature enthusiast (yellow) and Barbabeau, a painter (black and furry), as well as three daughters: Barbalala, a musician (green), Barbabelle, a narcissistic beauty queen (purple), and Barbalib, an intellectual (orange).

Adaptations

Television 
A few years after the book had been produced, and when more titles had been published, Fehmers expanded the project to television films in conjunction with Joop Visch of Polyscope-PolyGram, with the storyboards designed by Taylor. After twelve years, Fehmers and Tison/Taylor discontinued their business relationship. The first cartoon film was almost five minutes long and was released on television in 1974. One hundred episodes of the cartoon series, spanning two seasons, were produced and aired on television.

In 1999, a Japanese animated series called Barbapapa Around the World (Japanese: バーバパパ 世界をまわる, Hepburn: Barbapapa Sekai wo Mawaru) was aired. Animated by Studio Pierrot and produced by Kodansha, the series depicted the family going on a vacation through different countries. The series aired over 50 episodes.

In 2019, a new animated show, called "Barbapapa: One Big Happy Family!", was produced by Normaal Animation. It currently airs on TF1 in France, Yle TV2 in Finland, and Nick Jr. in other countries. The show was written by Alice Taylor and Thomas Taylor. Alice is the daughter of Tison and Taylor. The English dub was produced by Jungle Studios in the United Kingdom and features a cast of up-and-coming child actors.

Music 
The first Barbapapa theme's lyrics were written by Harrie Geelen, and the music composed by Joop Stokkermans.

The Japanese version of the series, as aired on TV Tokyo, features an entirely different theme song from the original series, composed by Chuuji Kinoshita with lyrics by Zenzo Matsuyama. The Italian version's song was sung by singer-songwriter Roberto Vecchioni.

The Spanish kids' group Parchis made a song about the characters of the cartoon, named "Barbapapá".

An Israeli song named "Barba'aba" (ברבאבא) was written by Yoram Taharlev and performed by Tzipi Shavit in 1978. It talks about Barbapapa being shunned by everyone for looking weird until he met Barbamama. The song became a kids' classic.

Comic book 
A comic book version was also created. Both cartoons and comics sometimes show concerns about the environment and contain environmental messages.

Legacy
The Barbapapa cartoon is popular in many countries worldwide and has been dubbed into a wide variety of languages, including five separate English dubs. In the United States, it was syndicated on various networks throughout the 1970s with a dub by Magno Sound and Video in New York. The original series continues to air to this day on television in Italy and France, and Barbapapa merchandise is still being produced annually in Japan.

Google created a doodle celebrating the 45th anniversary of the publishing of Barbapapa on May 19, 2015. Also to memorialise Talus Taylor. 

The song "Ce matin là" by the French electronic music duo Air (from their album Moon Safari) was inspired by the horn sounds on the Barbapapa show, per the band.

References

External links

1970 children's books
French children's books
French picture books
Series of children's books
French comics titles
Topcraft
Fictional shapeshifters
Children's books adapted into television shows
Novels adapted into comics
1973 French television series debuts
1975 French television series endings
1977 French television series debuts
1977 French television series endings
French children's animated fantasy television series
Male characters in literature
Male characters in animation
Internet memes
Television series about shapeshifting
Television series by Saban Entertainment